Ostrovnoy, previously known as Murmansk-140, is a closed town in Murmansk Oblast, Russia. As of the 2010 Census, its population was 2,171; down from 5,032 recorded in the 2002 Census.

History
The first naval base was established here in 1915. There is no rail link to Ostrovnoy and the settlement is reachable by coastal ship, helicopter or small plane in winter.

Until 1938, the town was known as Yokanga. Until 1981, the town was known as Gremikha.

The Gremikha Naval Base was one of the Northern Fleet's main facilities for servicing nuclear submarines.

Administrative and municipal status
Within the framework of administrative divisions, it is, together with six rural localities, incorporated as the closed administrative-territorial formation of Ostrovnoy—an administrative unit with the status equal to that of the districts. As a municipal division, the closed administrative-territorial formation of Ostrovnoy is incorporated as Ostrovnoy Urban Okrug.

Notable residents 

Gerard Vasilyev (born 1935 in Tersko-Orlovsky Mayak), singer and actor

References

Notes

Sources

Cities and towns in Murmansk Oblast
Russian and Soviet Navy bases
Russian and Soviet Navy submarine bases
Road-inaccessible communities of Russia